Bernhard Andersen (5 February 1892 – 9 February 1958) was a Danish footballer. He competed in the men's tournament at the 1920 Summer Olympics.

References

External links
 

1892 births
1958 deaths
Danish men's footballers
Denmark international footballers
Olympic footballers of Denmark
Footballers at the 1920 Summer Olympics
Footballers from Copenhagen
Association football forwards
Fremad Amager players